Wade Memorial Chapel is a Neoclassical chapel and receiving vault located at Lake View Cemetery in Cleveland, Ohio, in the United States. It was donated to the cemetery by Jeptha Wade II in memory of his grandfather, cemetery and Western Union co-founder Jeptha Wade. The overall design was by the newly-founded Cleveland area architectural firm of Hubbell & Benes, and was their first commission. The interior's overall design is by Louis Comfort Tiffany based on a preexisting 1893 design. The interior features two mosaics on the right and left hand walls, and a large stained glass window.

Wade Memorial Chapel was added to the National Register of Historic Places on June 18, 1973.

Conception and siting of the chapel
In 1896, Jeptha H. Wade II decided to fund the construction of a new receiving vault and chapel, dedicated to the memory of his grandfather, at Lake View Cemetery. Wade asked the newly-founded Cleveland architectural firm of Hubbell & Benes to create a preliminary design. He was so happy with their work that he did not ask any other firm for a design. He chose their concept as the final design for the chapel and told Hubbell & Benes to finalize it and create blueprints.

The Lake View Cemetery Association, which owned the cemetery, did not formally accept the new chapel until these plans were done.

The site selected for the chapel was between two existing lakes, diagonally across a road from the existing public receiving vault. There was a slight hill here, and the structure was designed so that the crypt level could not be seen from the driveway that led to the front of the chapel.

Construction and cost
Ground for the new chapel was broken on February 19, 1898. The hillside was excavated  down to bedrock, and the foundations and crypt level finished in late December 1898. Completing the interior took much longer then expected, and the chapel was not finished until 1901.

Jeptha Wade II placed no limit on the cost of construction. The cost was variously reported to be $350,000 ($ in  dollars), $150,000 ($ in  dollars), $140,000 ($ in  dollars), and "more than $100,000" ($ in  dollars). The cost of the window was not known, but was estimated at several tens of thousands of dollars.

Wade gave Joseph Carabelli, owner of a prominent local funerary monument firm, a $1,000 ($ in  dollars) gift in appreciation of his excellent work in executing the marble work in the chapel's interior.

About the chapel
The modified Neoclassical building was T-shaped, with the rectangular chapel perpendicular to the rectangular crypt below.

Exterior
The front of the chapel features a portico that extends somewhat further than usual from the chapel proper. The portico is supported by fluted columns with Ionic capitals. A low gable roof covers the chapel and portico, and features a pediment with an unadorned tympanum in front. The entablature has an featureless frieze, although the cornice is carved with dentils.

The exterior walls are clad in near-white Barre granite from Barre, Vermont. Jeptha Wade II wanted white terra cotta for the exterior, but this idea was abandoned when the architects pointed out that the surface of terra cotta could not be made completely smooth. The architects preferred white marble, both for its suitability for sculpture and because its white color more easily reflected the effects of light and shadow. The Norcross Marble Company of Cleveland and Tiffany & Co. both suggested using Georgia, Lee, Rutland, South Dover, and Tuckahoe marbles, but all of them had discoloration problems or chemical properties which led to discoloration, easy erosion, or pock-marking.

Wade asked for a longer-lasting stone, and the architects chose granite. Because granite could not be carved in fine lines, the architects abandoned most of the decorative scheme they had proposed for the exterior and increased the size of the blocks used in the exterior walls. A variety of granites were considered, including Concord, Hallowell, North Jay, Troy, Westerly, and Barre. Once more, color and chemical issues led to the rejection of most types of granites. (Hallowell granite was acceptable, but rejected as too expensive.) The final choice came down to Troy and Barre. The granite used is known as "light Barre" and as "standard Barre". It is a biotite granite with a very light bluish-gray color. It is very even-grained, with the texture ranging from fine to medium.

The granite came from the Standard Granite Quarries Co. quarry near Barre, Vermont, and was cut by Barclay Bros. Forty railroad cars were required to haul it to Cleveland. The order was so large and important to the Barre granite industry that quarry owner William Barclay traveled to Cleveland in late 1898 to consult with the architects.

Three engaged columns of Barre granite are half-embedded in the side walls, while partially-embedded columns support each corner of the building. Two granite columns stand at the rear, and two on either side of the main entry door.

Portico and vestibule
The portico is supported by four columns of Barre granite, standing on Barre granite pedestals. The granite stones of the portico floor weigh a combined , and the three steps leading from the carriageway to the portico are carved from a single stone.

Bronze doors lead from the portico to the vestibule, which was lined with white marble from Georgia. Countersunk in an architrave over the chapel doors are the words "Erected in Memory of Jeptha H. Wade by his Grandson, A.D. MDCCCC".

Chapel

The chapel's interior measures . The interior decor was designed and manufactured by Tiffany & Co., and Louis Comfort Tiffany personally sought out the commission. After winning the project, Tiffany traveled to Cleveland to consult with Hubbell & Benes about the decor design. Art historian Hugh F. McKean concludes that Tiffany probably designed the interior himself, as many elements of the chapel reflect those used in Tiffany's chapel for the World's Columbian Exposition in Chicago in 1893.

The wainscoting and ceiling are both made of white marble from Georgia. The chapel features a massive stained glass window at the rear and mosaics on each side wall.

The stained glass window, titled Resurrection or Flight of the Soul, was designed by Tiffany artisan Agnes Northrop. It was exhibited at the Paris Exposition of 1900 before being installed at the chapel.

Known under various titles, including An Allegory of the Christian Religion and The Voyage of Life, the Favrile glass and gold tile mosaics depicted the passage of life to death. The left side mosaic became known as "The River of Life", while the other had the title "The River of Death".

Other elements of the chapel include a white Carrara marble lectern, white marble candlesticks atop the altar rail, and white mahogany pews. The sedilia, ceiling lamps, altar rail, candlesticks atop the altar rail, lectern, and casket pedestal are all made of white Carrara marble, often cut and carved with great delicacy and inlaid with colored glass, gold, and mother of pearl. Smaller clerestory windows of white frosted glass set in a heavy bronze grille are positioned above the chapel doors.

The chapel also features a casket pedestal behind the altar rail, in place of an altar. This pedestal can be lowered mechanically through the floor into crypt, where the receiving vault is located.

Crypts and receiving vault
The rectangular crypt rests on a specially designed platform made of sandstone.

The main facade of the crypt level features doors of bronze and windows barred with bronze grilles. Inside the crypt doors is an anteroom, from which a short corridor leads to the vaults. The "public" portion of the crypt can hold as many as 96 coffins. Two private receiving vaults also exist on the crypt level, closed off by marble doors. Each crypt is lined with Euclid bluestone (a bluish-colored sandstone quarried locally), while the cover of each crypt and all the interior walls of the crypt level are of white marble. Two small bronze grilles are set in each crypt cover, to ensure adequate ventilation. A ribbon of "subdued" colored stone, set at the height of a dado rail, provides the only color on the crypt level.

A short driveway gives access to the crypt entrance for the removal of caskets for burial.

Critical assessment
An anonymous writer for American Stone Trade praised Wade Memorial Chapel in 1916 as an "exquisite Greek temple". The industry journal focused particularly on the chapel's construction, noting, "In every detail it is perfectly finished, permanently bedded and jointed and of material in every way suitable for the purpose for which it is used." Alice Gould Pattinson of the American Federation of Arts called Wade Chapel one of the most notable monuments at Lake View.

References

Bibliography

Properties of religious function on the National Register of Historic Places in Ohio
Churches in Cleveland
Chapels in the United States
Neoclassical architecture in Ohio
Monuments and memorials in Ohio
Churches completed in 1901
20th-century churches in the United States
National Register of Historic Places in Cleveland, Ohio
University Circle
1901 establishments in Ohio
Neoclassical church buildings in the United States